The Morane-Saulnier S,also known as MoS-10, was a large twin-engined biplane bomber designed and built in France around 1916. Powered by two  Renault 12E V-12 water-cooled piston engines, with Hazet type side radiators, the 'S' was given the STAé designation MoS-10 and serial MS-625.

Variants
Morane-Saulnier S company designation for  Renault 12E V-12 powered version
MoS.10 B.3official French government STAe designation for the S
Morane-Saulnier Y company designation for  Hispano-Suiza 8Aa V-8  powered version.
MoS.24 B.3official French government STAe designation for the Y

Specifications (S)

References

Citations

Bibliography

Further reading

External links
 

1910s French bomber aircraft
S
Aircraft first flown in 1916